John Derek Page, Baron Whaddon (14 August 1927 – 16 August 2005), was a British politician and export agent/consultant.

Background
Derek Page, as he was usually known, was born the son of a lorry driver in Sale, Greater Manchester. He was educated at St Bede's College, Manchester, and the University of London, where he graduated with a Bachelor of Science in chemistry. Page was Director of the Cambridge Chemical Co. from 1962 and of Rindalbourne Ltd. from 1983 to 1990. He was also Chairman of Daltrade Ltd. from 1983, and of Skorimpex-Rind from 1986.

In 1964, he became Labour Member of Parliament (MP) for Kings Lynn, and held this seat until 1970, when he lost to the Conservative candidate Christopher Brocklebank-Fowler (who would later join the SDP). He refought Brocklebank-Fowler for the changed seat of North West Norfolk in February 1974 but was again defeated. Later he left Labour and himself defected to the SDP, but rejoined in 1994.

Peerage
On 26 April 1978, Page was created a life peer with the title Baron Whaddon, of Whaddon in the County of Cambridgeshire. In 1989, he was awarded the Golden Insignia of the Order of Merit by Poland.

Family
He was married firstly to Catherine Audrey Halls from 1948 until her death in 1979; they had two children. He married, secondly, to Angela Rixson in 1981, and they were married until his death.

Death
Lord Whaddon died two days after his 78th birthday on 16 August 2005.

Arms

References

Times Guide to the House of Commons, February 1974

External links 
 

1927 births
2005 deaths
20th-century British businesspeople
Labour Party (UK) MPs for English constituencies
UK MPs 1964–1966
UK MPs 1966–1970
UK MPs who were granted peerages
Alumni of the University of London
People educated at St Bede's College, Manchester
People from Sale, Greater Manchester
Whaddon
Social Democratic Party (UK) life peers
People from South Cambridgeshire District
Life peers created by Elizabeth II